One Prudential Plaza (formerly known as the Prudential Building) is a 41-story structure in Chicago completed in 1955 as the headquarters for Prudential's Mid-America company.  It was the first skyscraper built in Chicago since the Great Depression of the 1930s and the Second World War. The plaza, including a second building erected in 1990, is owned by BentleyForbes and a consortium of New York investors, since the Great Recession of the early 21st century.

History of construction

The structure was significant as the first new downtown skyscraper constructed in Chicago since the Field Building, 21 years earlier and was built on air rights over the Illinois Central Railroad. It was the last building ever connected to the Chicago Tunnel Company's tunnel network. When the Prudential was finished it had the highest roof in Chicago with only the statue of Ceres on the Chicago Board of Trade higher.  Its mast served as a broadcasting antenna for Chicago's WGN-TV. The architect was Naess & Murphy, a precursor to C.F. Murphy & Associates and later Murphy/Jahn Architects.

Later purchase
In May 2006, BentleyForbes, a Los Angeles-based real estate investment firm run by Frederick Wehba and his family, purchased One Prudential Plaza, along with its sister property, Two Prudential Plaza for $470 million.

After a default on the mortgage encumbering the towers during the Great Recession of the early 21st century, New York-based investors 601W Companies and Berkley Properties took control of the towers after investing more than $100 million in equity to recapitalize.   BentleyForbes, the prior controlling owner of the towers, continues to have an interest in the owning partnership.

Tenants

 Hillrom Corporate Headquarters
 Society of Women Engineers — Global Headquarters, 35th Floor
 American Institute of Steel Construction
 Wilson Sporting Goods
 Marketing Werks
 Cision
 Conversion Alliance
 No Limit Agency
 Chicago Federation of Labor
 McGraw Hill (Education And Test Prep Editorial)
 Vanderbilt Office Properties
 Envisionit Agency
 S&P Global Ratings
 Bowman, Barrett & Associates Inc.
 OppLoans
 Hubbard Chicago
 Custom Crafters
 Painters District Council 14
 Optiver

See also
List of buildings and structures
List of tallest buildings in Chicago
List of tallest buildings in the United States
List of tallest buildings in the world
World's tallest structures

Position in Chicago's skyline

References

External links

The Real Deal

Emporis entry for One Prudential Plaza
Olshan Frome Wolosky LLP

Office buildings completed in 1955
Prudential Financial buildings
Skyscraper office buildings in Chicago
Insurance company headquarters in the United States
1955 establishments in Illinois